St Paul's Grammar School is an independent non-denominational Christian co-educational early learning, primary and secondary day school, located in , an outer western suburb of Sydney, New South Wales, Australia. Established in 1983, St Paul's Grammar School has approximately 860 students, from early learning through Kindergarten to Year 12.

The school is a member of the Independent Schools Association, the Australian Heads of Independent Schools Association, and HICES.

Curriculum 
The school offers the NSW Education Standards Authority (NESA) courses from Kindergarten to Year 12. In addition to NESA courses, the school offers the International Baccalaureate educational programme from Kindergarten to Year 12. In the Junior and Middle Schools, the IB Programmes are integrated with the NSW NESA courses. The  IB Primary Years Programme (PYP) is taught in conjunction with the NESA curriculum to approximately 300 students from pre-Kindergarten to Year 6. The  IB Middle Years Programme (MYP) is taught in conjunction with NESA curriculum to approximately 300 students from Year 7 to Year 10. Students graduating from Year 10 achieve the International Baccalaureate  IB Middle Years Programme Certificate; students also received the former Board of Studies School Certificate before it was scrapped in 2011.

In Years 11 and 12, students can either undertake the IB Diploma Programme or the NESA Higher School Certificate. It has foreign language course options such as Latin, French, Chinese, and Spanish.

Facilities
The school's sporting facilities include an athletics oval, several smaller sports fields, 5 outdoor tennis courts, 4 soccer pitch, 1 cricket pitch, 4 outdoor basketball courts and an archery field.

The school has a sports centre with two indoor basketball courts and a small amount of spectator seating above them. This building is also used for major school functions with room for seating for 2,500 people. It also has a Science Block, a Technology Block and a Performing Arts block, in addition to regular classrooms.

Co-curricular 
Co-curricular activities offered by the school include music groups, dance classes, the Duke of Edinburgh Award scheme, chess and Bible study groups, and a New South Wales Rural Fire Service Cadets program.

Sports
Sports offered by the school include: athletics (track and field – carnivals), cross country running, basketball, cricket, indoor soccer, netball, soccer, tennis, and touch football. Equestrian events are also offered to students, including dressage, eventing and show jumping.

Notable alumni

 Pat Cummins, Australian test cricketer and captain
 Firass Dirani, actor
 Paige Leonhardt, swimmer
 Matilda McDonell, Australian netball player
 Fiona Scott, politician, former Member for the Lindsay
 Brittanie Shipway, singer and The Voice Australia contestant

See also

References

External links 
 Association of Independent Schools of New South Wales
 Association of Australasian IB Schools (AAIBS)

International Baccalaureate schools in Australia
Educational institutions established in 1983
Nondenominational Christian schools in Sydney
Junior School Heads Association of Australia Member Schools
Independent Schools Association (Australia)
1983 establishments in Australia
Private primary schools in Sydney
Private secondary schools in Sydney
City of Penrith